Salme is a village in Abkhazia, Georgia. It was founded in 1884 by Estonian resettlers from Kuusalu, Governorate of Estonia. In 1989 the village had 1659 inhabitants, mostly Estonians, Armenians, Georgians and Russians. Nowadays, most of the inhabitants are Abkhaz, as most of the Estonians were repatriated back to Estonia during the 1992-1993 Georgian-Abkhaz war. The village has subsequently been renamed Psou by Abkhaz authorities after the Psou River.

See also
 Gagra District

Notes

References

Populated places in Gagra District
Estonian diaspora